= Sidi Qadad =

- Neighbourhood
- Country: Syria
- City: Damascus

Sidi Qadad is a neighbourhood of Damascus, Syria.
